Eloise is a series of children's books written in the 1950s by Kay Thompson and illustrated by Hilary Knight. Thompson and Knight followed up Eloise (1955) with four sequels.

Eloise is a young girl who lives in the "room on the tippy-top floor" of the Plaza Hotel in New York City with her nanny, her pug dog, Weenie, and her turtle, Skipperdee.

History
The character was developed by the author based on her childhood imaginary friend and alter ego, with a voice in which Thompson spoke throughout her life, according to her biographer, filmmaker Sam Irvin. Thompson's goddaughter, Liza Minnelli, was often speculated as a possible model for Eloise.

The illustrator stated that the image for Eloise was based on one that his mother, Katherine Sturges Dodge, had painted, during the 1930s.

Books

Original
 Eloise: A Book for Precocious Grown-ups (1955)
 Eloise in Paris (1957)
 Eloise at Christmastime (1958)
 Eloise in Moscow (1959)
 Eloise Takes a Bawth (2002), posthumously published

Subsequent
Other modern Eloise titles released by Simon & Schuster include Eloise's Guide to Life (2000), Eloise at Christmas (2003), Eloise's What I Absolutely Love Love Love (2005) and Love & Kisses, Eloise (2005). The same publisher began producing Eloise stories "in the style of Kay Thompson and Hilary Knight" to their early-reader Ready-to-Reads line in 2005. By 2007, 11 titles had been released in that line.

Thompson's time on the set of the 1957 musical film Funny Face inspired a new Eloise cartoon—Eloise in Hollywood (2006).

Bernadette Peters narrates a collection of four Eloise stories—"Eloise", "Eloise in Paris", "Eloise at Christmastime", and "Eloise in Moscow", released by Simon & Schuster Audio in October 2015. They are available in audiobook and CD and book.

Dramatic adaptations
In 2003, two made-for-TV movies based on the first two books were made by Walt Disney Television, titled Eloise at the Plaza and Eloise at Christmastime, starring Sofia Vassilieva as Eloise and Julie Andrews as Nanny. In 2006, an animated television series based on the characters of the books, premiered on Starz! Kids & Family, featuring Mary Matilyn Mouser as Eloise and Lynn Redgrave as Nanny.

A direct-to-DVD animated feature entitled Eloise in Africa was announced in February 2009 but was never finished. It would have been made entirely at Animation Collective’s New York City facility. In 2011, an animatic from the film was uploaded onto Vimeo.

A movie based on Eloise in Paris, starring Jordana Beatty as the title character and Uma Thurman as Nanny, was being developed by Charles Shyer, director of Alfie and Father of the Bride but little, if any, development on the film has been announced, and it was reported in 2010 that Thurman filed and subsequently settled a lawsuit against Handmade Films for £6m after production stalled and the company failed to meet her initial pay-or-play fee.

In 2020 it was announced that the film re-entered development at MRC Film, to be written by Beauty and the Beast screenwriter Linda Woolverton and produced by Handmade Films.

Television
Playhouse 90, "Eloise" (broadcast on November 22, 1956)
Eloise: The Animated Series (broadcast from October 8 to November 12, 2006)

Movies
 Eloise at the Plaza (2003)
 Eloise at Christmastime (2003)
 Eloise in Paris (Cancelled)
 Eloise in Africa (Cancelled)
 Untitled Eloise live-action film (TBA)

Legacy
A portrait of Eloise was hung in the lobby of the Plaza until it closed for renovations in 2005. The portrait was re-hung in May 2008 after three years in storage.

Filmmaker Lena Dunham sports an Eloise tattoo and produced the HBO documentary short, It's Me, Hilary: The Man Who Drew Eloise, chronicling the life and career of series co-author and illustrator Hilary Knight.

See also

 Evelyn Rudie
 Suzuki Beane

References

External links

 Irvin, Sam LIFE Magazine article (26 Nov 1956)
Kay Thompson: From Funny Face to Eloise; Simon and Schuster; New York; 2011, p. 122. 

 
Fictional characters from New York City
Characters in children's literature
Series of children's books
Child characters in literature
Literary characters introduced in 1955